Anopinella transecta is a species of moth of the family Tortricidae. It is found in Costa Rica.

The length of the forewings is 5.9-6.2 mm.

External links
Systematic revision of Anopinella Powell (Lepidoptera: Tortricidae: Euliini) and phylogenetic analysis of the Apolychrosis group of genera

Anopinella
Moths described in 2003
Moths of Central America